The Riggs–Tompkins Building is an historic structure located in the Columbia Heights neighborhood of Washington, D.C.  George N. Ray designed the building that was completed in 1922.  It has been listed on the District of Columbia Inventory of Historic Sites since 1985 and it was listed on the National Register of Historic Places in 1987.

References

Commercial buildings completed in 1922
1922 establishments in Washington, D.C.
Neoclassical architecture in Washington, D.C.
Bank buildings on the National Register of Historic Places in Washington, D.C.